Football is one of the events at the 2016 South Asian Games. It is the second edition to introduce Women's football to the Games, alongside Men's.

Medalists

Medal table

Source : South Asian Games 2016

References

2016 South Asian Games
Events at the 2016 South Asian Games
2016 South Asian Games